Arson is the crime of willfully and deliberately setting fire to property.

Arson may also refer to:

Nicholaus Arson, Niklas Almqvist (born 1977), Swedish musician, lead guitarist of the Hives
"Arson", a 2004 song by Amon Amarth from Fate of Norns
"Arson", a 2022 song by J-Hope from Jack in the Box

See also

Arsonists (disambiguation)
Quickfire (disambiguation)
Torched (disambiguation)
Fire-raising (disambiguation)
Fire making
Pyromania